Rayleigh Castle (also known as Rayleigh Mount) was a masonry and timber castle built in the town of Rayleigh in Essex, England in the 11th century shortly after the Norman conquest. All that exists today are the earthwork remains of its large motte-and-bailey.

History
Rayleigh is one of 48 castles mentioned in the Domesday Survey of 1086 and the only one in the county of Essex. The Survey records that Swein (other spellings are Sweyn, Sweyne, and Suen) built the castle in his manor. He was the son of Robert FitzWimarc, a Norman lord and favourite of Edward the Confessor (r. 1042–1066). Swein was one of the wealthiest landowners in post-Conquest Essex, and the Survey records that in 1086 his lands were worth £255. As Swein was the son of a favourite of Edward it is likely that he did not arrive with William the Conqueror in 1066, but was instead born in England. Most land owners with  significant holdings at the time of the Domesday Survey had disjointed, scattered properties; however, Swein was one of the exceptions and most of his land was within the hundreds of Rochford and Barstable with Rayleigh Castle as the administrative centre.

Adrian Pettifer notes that Rayleigh's plan is similar to that of two other motte-and-bailey castles in Essex: Pleshey  and Ongar.

On Swein's death the castle passed to his son Robert of Essex (c. 1085 - died before 1159) and thence to his grandson Henry of Essex.  Around 1140 the motte was covered in stone rubble.

Henry was accused of cowardice in battle in 1163 and subject to a trial by combat, which he lost. The castle and its estates were confiscated to become the property of the king, Henry II. Extensive alterations were made to it in 1172 and in 1183-4.

On the death of Hubert's son in the latter half of the 13th century, ownership of the castle reverted to the Crown.  Documents dating between 1279 and 1303 refer to the motte being used for pasture, which probably means that the castle was no longer used as a fortification.  In 1394 King Richard II gave permission for the townspeople of Rayleigh to use the foundations of the castle as a source of stone. Since the foundations are explicitly mentioned in the document giving permission, it is unlikely that any other masonry structures remained by then.

21st century 
The site of the castle was used for grazing sheep after it fell into disuse. Photos taken in the 1920s show the mount free from any large trees or shrubs as the grazing prevented their growth; however since the grazing stopped, large trees have grown on the site. The National Trust who manage the site have no plans to remove the trees for fear of disturbing any potential archaeology below.

See also
 Castles in Great Britain and Ireland
 List of castles in England

References
Notes

Bibliography

External links
Bibliography of sources relating to Rayleigh Castle
National Trust guide to Rayleigh Mount

Castles in Essex
National Trust properties in Essex
Castle
Buildings and structures completed in the 11th century